Tallassee may refer to the following places in the United States:

 Tallassee, Alabama
Tallassee Airport
 Tallassee, Tennessee
 Tallassee (Cherokee town), Tennessee, a prehistoric and historic Native American site

See also
Tallahassee